The Farmville Herald is a semi-weekly newspaper in Farmville, Virginia, United States of America. The Farmville Herald is a bi-weekly newspaper serving Buckingham, Cumberland and Prince Edward counties and the Town of Farmville. Thanks to a partnership with the Farmville Herald, Longwood University, and the Library of Virginia, the Farmville Herald is being digitized and now available on Virginia Chronicle

References

F
F
1890 establishments in Virginia